Bill Lawrence (born 19 September 1963) is a New Zealand former cricketer. He played in eight first-class and six List A matches for Canterbury from 1986 to 1988. After his cricket career, he became a bank manager.

See also
 List of Canterbury representative cricketers

References

External links
 

1963 births
Living people
New Zealand cricketers
Canterbury cricketers
Cricketers from Christchurch